Kulttuurivihkot (Finnish: Cultural notes) is a Finnish language bimonthly left-wing political and arts magazine published in Helsinki, Finland. It has been in circulation since 1973.

History and profile
Kulttuurivihkot was founded by a group linked to the Association for Cultural Workers in Finland in 1973. One of the founders was Juha Virkkunen, a Finnish journalist. He was also the founding editor-in-chief of the magazine. Kulttuurivihkot had a Marxist stance until 1991 when it became an independent left-wing magazine. It is published by Domirola Inc. on a bimonthly basis. The magazine covers articles on arts, cultural politics and ideologies from a left-wing perspective.

Kulttuurivihkot and the independent left, a political student organization at the University of Helsinki, have offered the Leonid Brezhnev peace prize since 2002. The prize was named after the Soviet Union leader Leonid Brezhnev. In 2002 the recipients of the award were George W. Bush, the US president, and Tony Blair, the prime minister of United Kingdom.

See also
List of magazines in Finland

References

External links
  

1973 establishments in Finland
Bi-monthly magazines published in Finland
Finnish-language magazines
Magazines established in 1973
Magazines published in Helsinki
Political magazines published in Finland
Socialist magazines
Visual arts magazines